Romeo Santos is an American singer who has received awards and nominations for his contributions to the music industry. Santos was the lead singer and composer for Aventura, an American band which infused Dominican bachata music with hip-hop and R&B, and as of 2011, sold over 1.7 million records in the United States. During his time with the band, Santos received twelve American Society of Composers, Authors and Publishers (ASCAP) awards including Songs of the Year for his compositions "Un Beso", "Mi Corazoncito", and "Dile al Amor". He also received an ASCAP award in 2006 for Frankie J's cover of "Obsesión" and was named Latin Songwriter of the Year in 2012 and 2013. Santos wrote and performed "No, No, No" for Mexican singer Thalía on her album El Sexto Sentido: Re+Loaded (2006) which earned the duo a Lo Nuestro award for Pop Song of the Year and three Premios Juventud nominations.

Following the band's temporary separation in 2011, Romeo Santos released his debut album Formula, Vol. 1. It was nominated for a Grammy Award for Best Traditional Tropical Latin Album, receiving nominations at the Billboard Music Awards, Billboard Latin Music Awards, Premios Juventud, Lo Nuestro Awards, and Soberano Awards. His debut single "You" was nominated for Tropical Song of the Year at the Billboard Latin Music Awards of 2012 and Premio Lo Nuestro 2012, winning the award at the 2012 ASCAP awards. "Promise" is the highest nominated track from the album with seven nominations. "Mi Santa" and "La Diabla" follow with four. Additionally, his first live album, The King Stays King: Sold Out at Madison Square Garden, also received a Billboard Latin Music Award nomination for Tropical Album of the Year. Overall, Santos has received 138 awards from 350 nominations.

ALMA Awards
The American Latino Media Arts Award or ALMA Award is an award highlighting the best American Latino contributions to music, television, and film. Santos has received one nomination.

|-
| 2012
| rowspan="1"| Himself
| rowspan="1"|Favorite Male Music Artist
|

American Music Awards
The American Music Awards are awarded annually by the American Broadcasting Company in the United States. Santos has received four nominations, winning two times with Aventura.

|-
| 2009
| rowspan="3"| Himself
| rowspan="3"|Favorite Latin Artist
| 
|-
| 2013
| 
|-
| 2014
| 
|-

ASCAP Awards
The ASCAP Awards are awarded annually by the American Society of Composers, Authors and Publishers in the United States. Santos has received twenty eight awards from twenty eight nominations.

|-
|2006
|scope="row"| "Obsesión"
|Pop/Ballad
| 
|-
|rowspan="2" scope="row"| 2007
|scope="row"| "Un Beso"
|Songs of the Year
| 
|-
|scope="row"| "Noche de Sexo"
|Urban
| 
|-
|rowspan="2" scope="row"| 2008
|scope="row"| "Mi Corazoncito"
|scope="row"| Latin Song of the Year
| 
|-
|scope="row"| "Los Infieles"
|rowspan="5" scope="row"|Tropical Song of the Year
| 
|-
|rowspan="2" scope="row"| 2009
|scope="row"| "El Perdedor"
| 
|-
|scope="row"| "Mi Corazoncito"
| 
|-
|rowspan="3" scope="row"| 2010
|scope="row"| "Por un Segundo"
| 
|-
|scope="row"| "Su Veneno"
| 
|-
|scope="row"| "All Up 2 You"
|scope="row"| Urban Song of the Year
| 
|-
|rowspan="3" scope="row"| 2011
|scope="row"| "Dile al Amor"
|scope="row"| Song of the Year
|
|-
|scope="row"| "El Malo"
|rowspan="2" scope="row"| Tropical Song of the Year
| 
|-
|scope="row"| "Su Veneno"
| 
|-
|rowspan="3" scope="row"| 2012
|scope="row"| "Himself"
|scope="row"| Songwriter of the Year
| 
|-
|scope="row"| "Promise"
|rowspan="2" scope="row"| Tropical Song of the Year
| 
|-
|scope="row"| "You"
| 
|-
|rowspan="4" scope="row"| 2013
|scope="row"| "Himself"
|scope="row"| Songwriter of the Year
| 
|-
|scope="row"| "La Diabla"
|rowspan="3" scope="row"| Tropical Song of the Year
| 
|-
|scope="row"| "Mi Santa"
| 
|-
|scope="row"| "Promise"
| 
|-
|rowspan="4" scope="row"| 2014
|scope="row"| "Himself"
|scope="row"| Songwriters of the Year
| 
|-
|scope="row"| "Llévame Contigo"
|rowspan="3" scope="row"| Tropical Song of the Year
| 
|-
|scope="row"| "Loco"
| 
|-
|scope="row"| "Propuesta Indecente"
| 
|-
|rowspan="4" scope="row"| 2015
|scope="row"| "Himself"
|scope="row"| Songwriters of the Year
| 
|-
|scope="row"| "Eres Mía"
|rowspan="6" scope="row"| Tropical Songs of the Year
| 
|-
|scope="row"| "Odio"
| 
|-
|scope="row"| "Propuesta Indecente"
| 
|-
|rowspan="3" scope="row"| 2017
|scope="row"| “Amorcito Enfermito”
| 
|-
|scope="row"| “Inocente”
| 
|-
|scope="row"| “Necio”
| 
|-
|rowspan="3" scope="row"| 2019
|scope="row"| "Bella y Sensual"
|rowspan="3" scope="row"| Award-Winning Songs
| 
|-
|scope="row"| "Ella Quiere Beber (Remix)"
| 
|-
|scope="row"| "Sobredosis"
| 
|-

Billboard Music Awards
The Billboard Music Awards are awarded annually by the Billboard magazine in the United States. Santos has received two awards from fourteen nominations.

|-
|rowspan="3" scope="row"| 2012
|scope="row"| Himself
|scope="row"| Top Latin Artist
| 
|-
|scope="row"| Formula, Vol. 1
|scope="row"| Top Latin Album
| 
|-
|scope="row"| "Promise"
|scope="row"| Top Latin Song
| 
|-
|rowspan="2" scope="row"| 2013
|scope="row"| Himself
|scope="row"| Top Latin Artist
| 
|-
|scope="row"| Formula, Vol. 1
|scope="row"| Top Latin Album
| 
|-
|rowspan="4" scope="row"| 2014
|scope="row"| Himself
|scope="row"| Top Latin Artist
| 
|-
|scope="row"| Formula, Vol. 2
|scope="row"| Top Latin Album
| 
|-
|scope="row"| "Loco" (with Enrique Iglesias)
|rowspan="2" scope="row"| Top Latin Song
| 
|-
|scope="row"| "Propuesta Indecente"
| 
|-
|rowspan="5" scope="row"| 2015
|scope="row"| Himself
|scope="row"| Top Latin Artist
| 
|-
|scope="row"| Formula, Vol. 2
|scope="row"| Top Latin Album
| 
|-
|scope="row"| "Eres Mía
|rowspan="3" scope="row"| Top Latin Song
| 
|-
|scope="row"| "Propuesta Indecente"
| 
|-
|scope="row"| "Odio"
| 
|-
|rowspan="3" scope="row"| 2016
|scope="row"| Himself
|scope="row"| Top Latin Artist
| 
|-
|scope="row"| Formula, Vol. 2
|scope="row"| Top Latin Album
| 
|-
|scope="row"| "Propuesta Indecente"
|scope="row"| Top Latin Song
| 
|-
|rowspan="2" scope="row"| 2018
|scope="row"| Himself
|scope="row"| Top Latin Artist
| 
|-
|scope="row"| Golden
|scope="row"| Top Latin Album
| 
|-
|rowspan="1" scope="row"| 2019
|scope="row"| Himself
|scope="row"| Top Latin Artist
| 
|-

Billboard Latin Music Awards
The Billboard Latin Music Awards are awarded annually by the Billboard magazine in the United States. Santos has received 23 awards from 63 nominations as a solo artist, for a total of 43 awards from 124 nominations including Aventura's onces.

|-
|rowspan="1" scope="row"| 2007
|rowspan="8" scope="row"| Himself
|rowspan="4" scope="row"| Songwriter of the Year
| 
|-
|rowspan="1" scope="row"| 2008
| 
|-
|rowspan="1" scope="row"| 2010
| 
|-
|rowspan="1" scope="row"| 2011
| 
|-
|rowspan="10" scope="row"| 2012
|scope="row"| Artist of the Year
| 
|-
|scope="row"| Tropical Artist of the Year, Solo
| 
|-
|scope="row"| Album Artist of the Year, Male
| 
|-
|scope="row"| Tropical Song Artist of the Year, Male
| 
|-
|rowspan="3" scope="row"| Formula, Vol. 1
|scope="row"| Album of the Year
| 
|-
|scope="row"|Digital Album of the Year
| 
|-
|scope="row"|Tropical Album of the Year
| 
|-
|rowspan="2" scope="row"| "Promise"
|scope="row"| Vocal Event Song of the Year
| 
|-
|rowspan="2" scope="row"|Tropical Song of the Year
| 
|-
|scope="row"| "You"
| 
|-
|rowspan="12" scope="row"| 2013
|rowspan="4" scope="row"| Himself
|scope="row"| Artist of the Year
| 
|-
|scope="row"|Album Artist of the Year, Male
|
|-
|scope="row"|Tropical Albums Artist of the Year, Solo
|
|-
|scope="row"|Tropical Songs Artist of the Year, Solo
|
|-
|rowspan="3" scope="row"| Formula, Vol. 1
|scope="row"|Album of the Year
|
|-
|scope="row"|Digital Album of the Year
|
|-
|rowspan="2" scope="row"|Tropical Album of the Year
|
|-
|scope="row"| The King Stays King: Sold Out at Madison Square Garden
|
|-
|rowspan="3" scope="row"| "Promise"
|scope="row"|Digital Song of the Year
|
|-
|scope="row"|Streaming Song of the Year
|
|-
|rowspan="2" scope="row"|Tropical Song of the Year
|
|-
|scope="row"|"La Diabla"
|
|-
|rowspan="17" scope="row"| 2014
|rowspan="7" scope="row"| Himself
|scope="row"| Artist of the Year
| 
|-
|scope="row"|Hot Latin Songs Artist of the Year, Male
|
|-
|scope="row"|Latin Pop Songs Artist of the Year, Solo
|
|-
|scope="row"|Tropical Songs Artist of the Year, Solo
|
|-
|scope="row"|Tropical Albums Artist of the Year, Solo
|
|-
|scope="row"|Songwriter of the Year
|
|-
|scope="row"|Producer of the Year
|
|-
|rowspan="4" scope="row"| "Propuesta Indecente"
|scope="row"|Hot Latin Song of the Year
|
|-
|scope="row"|Digital Song of the Year
|
|-
|scope="row"|Streaming Song of the Year
|
|-
|scope="row"|Tropical Song of the Year
|
|-
|rowspan="6" scope="row"| "Loco" (with Enrique Iglesias)
|scope="row"|Hot Latin Song of the Year
|
|-
|scope="row"|Latin Pop Song of the Year
|
|-
|scope="row"|Hot Latin Song of the Year, Vocal Event
|
|-
|scope="row"|Airplay Song of the Year
|
|-
|scope="row"|Streaming Song of the Year
|
|-
|scope="row"|Tropical Song of the Year
|
|-
|rowspan="20" scope="row"| 2015
|rowspan="7" scope="row"| Himself
|scope="row"| Artist of the Year
| 
|-
|scope="row"|Hot Latin Songs Artist of the Year, Male
|
|-
|scope="row"|Top Latin Albums Artist of the Year, Male
|
|-
|scope="row"|Tropical Songs Artist of the Year, Solo
|
|-
|scope="row"|Tropical Albums Artist of the Year, Solo
|
|-
|scope="row"|Songwriter of the Year
|
|-
|scope="row"|Producer of the Year
|
|-
|rowspan="2" scope="row"| Formula, Vol. 2
|scope="row"|Top Latin Album of the Year
|
|-
|scope="row"|Tropical Album of the Year
|
|-
|rowspan="6" scope="row"| "Odio"
|scope="row"|Hot Latin Song of the Year
|
|-
|scope="row"|Hot Latin Song of the Year, Vocal Event
|
|-
|scope="row"|Tropical Song of the Year
|
|-
|scope="row"|Airplay Song of the Year
|
|-
|scope="row"|Streaming Song of the Year
|
|-
|scope="row"|Digital Song of the Year
|
|-
|rowspan="4" scope="row"| "Eres Mía"
|scope="row"|Hot Latin Song of the Year
|
|-
|scope="row"|Airplay Song of the Year
|
|-
|scope="row"|Streaming Song of the Year
|
|-
|scope="row"|Tropical Song of the Year
|
|-
|scope="row"| "Yo Tambien" (with Marc Anthony)
|scope="row"|Tropical Song of the Year
|
|-
|rowspan="1" scope="row"| 2017
|rowspan="1" scope="row"| Himself
|scope="row"| Tropical Songs Artist of the Year, Solo
| 
|-
|rowspan="5" scope="row"| 2018
|rowspan="2" scope="row"| Himself
|scope="row"| Tropical Songs Artist of the Year, Solo
| 
|-
|scope="row"| Top Latin Albums Artist of the Year, Male
| 
|-
|rowspan="1" scope="row"| "Heroe Favorito"
|rowspan="2" scope="row"| Tropical Song  of the Year
| 
|-
|rowspan="1" scope="row"| “Imitadora”
| 
|-
|rowspan="1" scope="row"| Golden
|rowspan="1" scope="row"| Tropical Album  of the Year
| 
|-
|rowspan="2" scope="row"| 2019
|rowspan="5" scope="row"| Himself
|scope="row"| Tour of the Year
| 
|-
|scope="row"| Top Latin Albums Artist of the Year, Male
| 
|-
|rowspan="6" scope="row"| 2020
|scope="row"| Artist of the Year
| 
|-
|scope="row"| Top Latin Albums Artist of the Year, Male
| 
|-
|scope="row"| Tropical Artist of the Year, Solo
| 
|-
|rowspan="1" scope="row"|  “Ella Quiere Beber”
|scope="row"| Streaming Song of the Year
| 
|-
|rowspan="1" scope="row"|“Aullando”
|scope="row"| Tropical Song of the Year
| 
|-
|rowspan="1" scope="row"|Utopía
|scope="row"| Tropical Album of the Year
| 
|-
|rowspan="2" scope="row"| 2021
|rowspan="3" scope="row"| Himself
|scope="row"| Male Top Latin Albums Artist of the Year
| 
|-
|rowspan="2"scope="row"| Tropical Artist of the Year
| 
|-
|rowspan="2" scope="row"| 2022
| 
|-
|scope="row"| "Sus Huellas"
|scope="row"| Tropical Song of the Year
| 
|-

BMI Awards
Broadcast Music, Inc. (BMI) annually hosts award shows that honor the songwriters, composers and music publishers of the year's most-performed songs in the BMI catalog. Santos has received one from one nomination.

|-
|rowspan="1" scope="row"|2013
|scope="row"|"Promise"
|rowspan="1" scope="row"|Award-Winning Songs
|
|-

Grammy Awards
The Grammy Awards are awarded annually by the National Academy of Recording Arts and Sciences in the United States. Santos has received one nomination.

|-
|scope="row"|
|scope="row"| Formula, Vol. 1
|Best Tropical Latin Album
|

Heat Latin Music Awards
The Heat Latin Music Awards is an annual awards show that honors the year's biggest Latin music acts. Santos has received one nomination.

|-
| scope="row"|2019
|rowspan="2" scope="row"| Himself
|Best Male Artist
| 
|-
|rowspan="2" scope="row"|2020
|Best Tropical Artist
| 
|-
|scope="row"| "La Mejor Versión De Mi" 
|Best Male Artist
| 
|-
| scope="row"|2021
| rowspan="3" scope="row"| Himself
|Best Tropical Artist
| 
|-
| rowspan="2" scope="row"|2022
|Best Male Artist
|
|-
|Best Tropical Artist
|
|-

iHeartRadio Music Awards
The iHeartRadio Music Awards is a music awards show that celebrates music heard throughout the year across iHeartRadio radio stations in the United States. The event recognizes the most popular artists and music over the past year. Winners are chosen per cumulative performance data, while the public is able to vote in several categories. Santos has received one solo nomination and one with Aventura.

|-
|scope="row"|2016
|scope="row"| "Hilito"
|Latin Song of the Year
|

Latin American Music Awards
The Latin American Music Awards is an annual American music award that is presented by Telemundo. It is the Spanish-language counterpart of the American Music Awards. Santos has received twenty-one nominations winning three times.

|-
|rowspan="4"| 2015
|rowspan="2"|Himself
| Artist of the Year
| 
|-
|Favorite Tropical Artist
| 
|-
|rowspan="2"|"Hilito"
|Song if the Year
| 
|-
|Favorite Tropical Song
| 
|-
|rowspan="5"| 2017
|rowspan="2"|Himself
| Artist of the Year
| 
|-
|Favorite Tropical Artist
| 
|-
|"Imitadora"
|Favorite Tropical Song
| 
|-
|rowspan="2"|Golden
|Album of the Year
| 
|-
|Favorite Tropical Album
| 
|-
|rowspan="4"| 2018
|Himself
|Favorite Tropical Artist
| 
|-
|“Bella y Sensual”
|rowspan="2"|Favorite Tropical Song
| 
|-
|“Sobredosis”
| 
|-
|Golden Tour
|Favorite Tour
| 
|-
|rowspan="8"| 2019
| rowspan="3"| Himself
|Artist of the Year
| 
|-
|Favorite Male Artist
| 
|-
|Favorite Tropical Artist
| 
|-
|rowspan="2"|“Ella Quiere Beber“
|Song of the Year
| 
|-
|Favorite Urban Song
| 
|-
|"Centavito"
|rowspan="2"|Favorite Tropical Song
| 
|-
|"Aullando"
| 
|-
|Utopía
|Favorite Tropical Album
| 
|-
|rowspan="2"| 2021
|Himself
| Favorite Tropical Artist
| 
|-
|"Nuestro Amor" 
|Favorite Tropical Song
| 
|-
|2022
|Himself
| Favorite Tropical Artist
| 
|-

Latin Grammy Awards
The Latin Grammy Awards are accolades annually awarded by the Latin Academy of Recording Arts & Sciences to products recorded either in Spanish or Portuguese.
Santos has received one nomination.

|-
|style="text-align:left;"| 2018 || Golden|| Best Contemporary Tropical Album || 
|-

Lo Nuestro Awards
The Lo Nuestro Awards are awarded annually by television network Univision in the United States. Santos has received nine awards from 34 nominations as a solo artist, for a total of 26 awards and 62 nominations with Aventura.

|-
| scope="row"| 2007
| scope="row"| "No, No, No"
|scope="row"| Pop Song of the Year
| 
|-
|rowspan="3" scope="row"| 2012
|rowspan="2" scope="row"| Himself
|scope="row"| Tropical Male Artist of the Year
| 
|-
|scope="row"| Contemporary Tropical Artist of the Year
| 
|-
|scope="row"| "You"
|scope="row"| Tropical Song of the Year
| 
|-
|rowspan="6" scope="row"| 2013
|rowspan="3" scope="row"| Himself
|scope="row"| Artist of the Year
| 
|-
|scope="row"| Tropical Male Artist of the Year
| 
|-
|scope="row"| Contemporary Tropical Artist of the Year
| 
|-
|rowspan="2" scope="row"| "Mi Santa"
|scope="row"| Collaboration of the Year
| 
|-
|rowspan="2" scope="row"| Tropical Song of the Year
| 
|-
|scope="row"| "La Diabla"
| 
|-
|rowspan="4" scope="row"| 2014
|rowspan="2" scope="row"| Himself
|scope="row"| Tropical Male Artist of the Year
| 
|-
|scope="row"| Contemporary Tropical Artist of the Year
| 
|-
|scope="row"| "Llévame Contigo"
|scope="row"| Tropical Song of the Year
| 
|-
|scope="row"| "Propuesta Indecente"
|scope="row"| Video of the Year
| 
|-
|rowspan="9" scope="row"| 2015
|rowspan="3" scope="row"| Himself
|scope="row"| Artist of the Year
| 
|-
|scope="row"| Tropical Male Artist of the Year
| 
|-
|scope="row"| Contemporary Tropical Artist of the Year
| 
|-
|scope="row"|Formula, Vol. 2
|scope="row"| Tropical Album of the Year
| 
|-
|scope="row"| "Propuesta Indecente"
|rowspan="3" scope="row"| Tropical Song of the Year
| 
|-
|scope="row"| "Loco" (with Enrique Iglesias)
| 
|-
|scope="row"| "Odio" (with Drake)
| 
|-
|scope="row"| "Loco" (with Enrique Iglesias)
|rowspan="2" scope="row"| Tropical Collaboration of the Year
| 
|-
|scope="row"| "Odio" (with Drake)
| 
|-
|rowspan="7" scope="row"| 2016
|rowspan="3" scope="row"| Himself
|scope="row"| Artist of the Year
| 
|-
|scope="row"| Tropical Male Artist of the Year
| 
|-
|scope="row"| Tropical Artist of the Year
| 
|-
|rowspan="2" scope="row"|"Yo También" (with Marc Anthony)
|scope="row"| Collaboration of the Year
| 
|-
|rowspan="3" scope="row"| Tropical Song of the Year
| 
|-
|scope="row"| "Eres Mía"
| 
|-
|scope="row"| "Hilito"
| 
|-
|-
|rowspan="4" scope="row"| 2017
|rowspan="4" scope="row"| Himself
|scope="row"| Artist of the Year
| 
|-
|scope="row"| Male Artist of the Year
| 
|-
|scope="row"| Tropical Artist of the Year
| 
|-
|scope="row"| Excellence Award
| 
|-
| scope="row"| 2019
| scope="row"| Golden Tour
|scope="row"| Tour of the Year
| 
|-
|rowspan="3" scope="row"| 2020
|rowspan="2" scope="row"| Himself
|scope="row"| Artist of the Year
| 
|-
|scope="row"| Tropical Artist of the Year
| 
|-
|Utopía
|scope="row"| Album of the Year
| 
|-
|rowspan="5" scope="row"| 2021
|scope="row"| Himself
|scope="row"| Tropical Artist of the Year
| 
|-
|rowspan="3" scope="row"|"La Mejor Versión De Mí (Remix)" (with Natti Natasha)
|scope="row"|Song of the Year
| 
|-
|scope="row"|Remix of the Year
| 
|-
|scope="row"|Tropical Song of the Year
| 
|-
|scope="row"| "Nuestro Amor" (with Alex Bueno)
|scope="row"| Tropical Collaboration of the Year
| 
|-
|rowspan="3" scope="row"| 2022
|scope="row"| Himself
|scope="row"| Tropical Artist of the Year
| 
|-
|scope="row"| "Fan De Tus Fotos" (with Nicky Jam)
|scope="row"| Pop Collaboration of the Year
| 
|-
|Utopía Live From Metlife Stadium
|scope="row"| Album of the Year
| 
|-
|rowspan="5" scope="row"| 2023
|scope="row"| Himself
|scope="row"| Tropical Artist of the Year
| 
|-
|rowspan="2" scope="row"|"Sus Huellas"
|scope="row"|Song of the Year
| 
|-
|scope="row"|Tropical Song of the Year
| 
|-
|scope="row"| "Sin Fin" (with Justin Timberlake)
|scope="row"| Crossover Collaboration of the Year
| 
|-
|scope="row"| "El Pañuelo" (with Rosalía)
|scope="row"| The Perfect Mix of the Year
| 
|-

MTV Video Music Awards
The MTV Video Music Awards (VMAs) is an award show by the cable network MTV to honor the top music videos of the year. Santos has received one award from one nomination.

|-
|rowspan="1" scope="row"|2012
|scope="row"|Himself
|rowspan="1" scope="row"|Best Latino Artist
|
|-

Oye! Awards
The Oye! Awards are awarded annually by the Academia Nacional de la Música en México in Mexico. Romeo Santos has received one nomination.

|-
|rowspan="1" scope="row"|2013
|scope="row"|Himself
|rowspan="1" scope="row"|Urban Soloist or Group
|
|-

Premios Juventud
The Premios Juventud are awarded annually by the television network Univision in the United States. Santos has received four awards from twenty-seven nominations as a solo artist, for a total of 14 awards and 41 nominations.

|-
|rowspan="3" scope="row"| 2007
|rowspan="3" scope="row"|"No, No, No"
|scope="row"|La Combinación Perfecta (The Perfect Combo)
|
|-
|scope="row"|Canción Corta-venas (Heart-Wrenching Song)
|
|-
|scope="row"|Mi Video Favorito (My Favorite Video)
|
|-
|rowspan="11" scope="row"| 2012
|rowspan="1" scope="row"|Formula, Vol. 1
|scope="row"|Lo Toco Todo (Just Play It All)
|
|-
|rowspan="5" scope="row"|"Promise"
|scope="row"|La Combinación Perfecta (The Perfect Combo)
|
|-
|scope="row"|La Más Pegajosa (Catchiest Tune)
|
|-
|scope="row"|Canción Corta-venas (Heart-Wrenching Song)
|
|-
|scope="row"|Mi Ringtone (My Ringtone)
|
|-
|rowspan="2" scope="row"|Mi Video Favorito (My Favorite Video)
|
|-
|rowspan="1" scope="row"|"Mi Santa"
|
|-
|rowspan="3" scope="row"| Himself
|scope="row"|¡Qué Rico se Mueve! (Best Moves)
|
|-
|scope="row"|Voz del Momento (Red Hot Artist)
|
|-
|scope="row"|Mi Artista Tropical (Favorite Tropical Artist)
|
|-
|rowspan="1" scope="row"|Formula, Vol. 1 Tour
|scope="row"|El Súper Tour (My Favorite Concert)
|
|-
|rowspan="7" scope="row"| 2013
|rowspan="3" scope="row"|Himself
|scope="row"|¡Qué Rico se Mueve! (Best Moves)
|
|-
|scope="row"|Voz del Momento (Red Hot Artist)
|
|-
|scope="row"|Mi Artista Tropical (Favorite Tropical Artist)
|
|-
|rowspan="3" scope="row"|"Llévame Contigo"
|scope="row"|La Más Pegajosa (Catchiest Tune)
|
|-
|scope="row"|Canción Corta-venas (Heart-Wrenching Song)
|
|-
|scope="row"|Mi Ringtone (My Ringtone)
|
|-
|rowspan="1" scope="row"|Fomula, Vol. 1 Tour
|scope="row"|El Súper Tour (My Favorite Concert)
|
|-
|rowspan="4" scope="row"| 2014
| scope="row"|Himself
|scope="row"|Follow me The Good
|
|-
| scope="row"|"Loco"
|rowspan="2" scope="row"|La Combinación Perfecta
|
|-
|scope="row"|"Odio"
|
|-
|scope="row"|"Fórmula Vol. 2"
|scope="row"|Lo Toco Todo (Just Play It All)
|
|-
|rowspan="2" scope="row"| 2015
| scope="row"|Himself
|scope="row"|Voz del Momento
|
|-
|scope="row"|"Yo también"
|scope="row"|La Combinación Perfecta
|
|-
|scope="row"| 2016
|scope="row"|Himself
|scope="row"|Mi Artista Tropical
|
|-
|rowspan="2" scope="row"| 2019
|rowspan="2" scope="row"|"Ella Quiere Beber"
|scope="row"|Best Song: Can't Get Enough of This Song
|
|-
|scope="row"|Best Song: The Traffic Jam
|
|-
|scope="row"| 2021
|scope="row"|"Tú Vas a Tener Que Explicarme (Remix)"
|scope="row"|Tropical Mix (Song with the Best Tropical Collaboration)
|
|-
|rowspan="5" scope="row"| 2022
|scope="row"|Himself
|scope="row"|Artist of the Youth – Male
|
|-
|rowspan="2" scope="row"|"Sus Huellas"
|scope="row"|The Catchiest Song
|
|-
|scope="row"|Best Tropical Hit
|
|-
|scope="row"|"Fan De Tus Fotos"
|scope="row"|The Perfect Mix
|
|-
|scope="row"|"Señor Juez"
|scope="row"|Best Tropical Mix
|
|-

Premios Tu Mundo
The Premios Tu Mundo are awarded annually by the television network Telemundo. Romeo Santos has received five nominations winning once.

|-
|rowspan="2" scope="row"|2012
|scope="row"|Himself
|rowspan="1" scope="row"|Soy Sexy and I Know It
|
|-
|scope="row"|"Mi Santa"
|rowspan="1" scope="row"|Canción Que Me Roba El Corazón
|
|-
|rowspan="1" scope="row"|2014
|rowspan="3" scope="row"|Himself
|rowspan="3" scope="row"|Favorite Tropical Artist
|
|-
|rowspan="1" scope="row"|2015
|
|-
|rowspan="1" scope="row"|2017
|

Soberano Awards
The Soberano Awards (formerly the Casandra Awards) are awarded annually by the Asociación de Cronistas de Arte of the Dominican Republic in the Dominican Republic. Santos has received ten awards from seventeen nominations.

|-
|scope="row"| 2006
|rowspan="5"  scope="row"| Himself
|rowspan="5" scope="row"| Composer of the Year
| 
|-
|scope="row"| 2007
| 
|-
|scope="row"| 2008
| 
|-
|scope="row"| 2009
| 
|-
|rowspan="2" scope="row"| 2012
| 
|-
|scope="row"| "You"
|scope="row"| Bachata Song of the Year
| 
|-
|rowspan="4" scope="row"| 2013
|scope="row"| Himself
|scope="row"| Most-Played Artist on Radio
| 
|-
|scope="row"| "La Diabla"
|scope="row"| Bachata Song of the Year
| 
|-
|scope="row"| Formula
|scope="row"| Concert of the Year
| 
|-
|scope="row"| Formula, Vol. 1
|scope="row"| Album of the Year
| 
|-
|rowspan="3" scope="row"| 2014
|rowspan="2" scope="row"| Himself
| Most-Played Artist on Radio
| 
|-
|scope="row"| Composer of the Year
| 
|-
|scope="row"| "Propuesta Indecente"
|scope="row"| Bachata Song of the Year
| 
|-
|rowspan="4" scope="row"| 2015
|rowspan="2" scope="row"| Himself
| Most-Played Artist on Radio
| 
|-
|scope="row"| Composer of the Year
| 
|-
|scope="row"| Formula, Vol. 2
|scope="row"| Album of the Year
| 
|-
|scope="row"| "Eres Mía"
|scope="row"| Bachata Song of the Year
| 
|-

See also

 List of awards and nominations received by Aventura

References

Santos, Romeo